Tulungagung Regency (pronounced ) is a regency (kabupaten) of East Java Province, Indonesia. It covers an area of 1,055.65 km2 and had a population of 990,159 at the 2010 Census and 1,089,775 at the 2020 Census. The administrative headquarters is in the town of Tulungagung.

Etymology
Previously, Tulungagung was only a small area located surrounding a location where the center of the town is situated now. That area was named Tulungagung, - in Old Javanese language, tulung means help, and agung means Almighty. It based on how it used to flood everywhere and people would pray to God so that it wouldn't flood, and thus formed the name "tulungagung". The larger area is called Ngrowo. Ngrowo was still used as the name of Tulungagung until the 20th century, when the capital city location was moved from Kalangbret to Tulungagung.

History
In 1205 AD, the Thani Lawadan community living in the southern part of Tulungagung received an honor from the last king of Daha, Kertajaya, for their loyalty to the king when there was a siege from the enemy coming from the east of Daha. That honor then was written into an ancient inscription namely Prasasti Lawadan marked as "Sukra Suklapada Mangga Siramasa" which describing the date of November 18, 1205 AD, the date when it was made. That date then officially being used as the establishment date of Tulungagung since 2003.

In Boyolangu Village (Boyolangu district), there is Gayatri Temple, a temple which also a mausoleum for Gayatri (Sri Rajapatni), the fourth wife of the first Majapahit King, Raden Wijaya (Kertarajasa Jayawardhana), who also the mother of the third Majapahit Queen, Sri Gitarja (Tribhuwana Wijayatunggadewi). Sri Rajapatni was the grandmother of the greatest Majapahit Emperor, Hayam Wuruk (Rajasanegara), who ruled Majapahit in its golden period with the support of his prime minister Gadjah Mada. The name of Boyolangu is shown in Nagarakertagama as a sacred place for Gayatri.

Geography
The other regencies and areas surrounding Tulungagung Regency are:
 North : Kediri Regency
 South : Indian Ocean
 East :  Blitar Regency
 West :  Trenggalek Regency

The northwest part of the regency is a portion of the Wilis-Liman mountain range; the central part is lowland; the southern part is a portion of the rocky Kapur Kidul mountain range which is also an enormous source of marble. In the northwest part of Tulungagung Regency, specifically in Sendang District, there is Mount Wilis, the highest point in Tulungagung Regency. In the capital of Tulungagung, there is the Ngrowo River, a tributary of the Brantas River, and it divides the capital of Tulungagung into northern and southern parts.

Administrative districts 
Tulungagung Regency is divided into nineteen districts (kecamatan), tabulated below with their areas and their population totals from the 2010 Census and the 2020 Census. The table also includes the number of administrative villages (rural desa and urban kelurahan) in each district, and its postal codes. 

Notes: (a) including 19 small offshore islands.

Climate 
Tulungagung has a tropical savanna climate (Aw) with moderate to little rainfall from May to October and heavy rainfall from November to April.

The Tulungagung government is led by Syahri Mulyo as the regent and Maryoto Birowo as the vice-regent since 2013.

Industries
Tulungagung is a major producer of marble slabs and marble handicraft product. It is the largest marble supply regencies in the southern part of East Java. In 1995, Tulungagung contributed over 33,800 M2 of marble through 2 companies. Today, we can visit many home-based marble craft workshops in Campurdarat Subdistrict. Many of these small shops support local artisans and the local economy. Beside marble craft workshops, tourists can find small and medium enterprises that focus on manufacturing housewares such as door mats and brooms made of natural coconut husks, recycled fabrics or other natural materials in Plosokandang district. Furthermore, hand-painted batik and ready-to-wear batik sewing workshops can be found scattered in some parts of the city. In Ngunut Subdistrict travelers can find knapsack, belt, and traditional fried snack industries. Some of the popular snacks are kacang Shanghai (individual peanut rolled in garlic-seasoned flour batter and slow-roasted on pan), kacang telor (individual peanut rolled in spice-seasoned egg flour batter, slow-roasted on pan).

References

External links

Official Web sites 
  Official Website of Tulungagung Regency

Other Web sites 
  Profile of Tulungagung Regency on Indonesia's Investment Coordination Board Website